Karina Bogaerts (born 6 August 1966) is a Belgian table tennis player. She competed in the women's singles event at the 1988 Summer Olympics.

References

External links
 

1966 births
Living people
Belgian female table tennis players
Olympic table tennis players of Belgium
Table tennis players at the 1988 Summer Olympics
Sportspeople from Brussels
20th-century Belgian women